Pixote: a Lei do Mais Fraco (lit. "Pixote (small child): The Law of the Weakest") is a 1980 Brazilian crime drama film directed by Héctor Babenco. The screenplay was written by Babenco and Jorge Durán, based on the book A Infância dos Mortos (The Childhood of the Dead Ones) by José Louzeiro.

It is a documentary-like account of Brazil's delinquent youth and how they are used by corrupt police and other crime organizations to commit crimes. The film features Fernando Ramos da Silva (who was killed at the age of 19 by Brazilian police in São Paulo) as Pixote and Marília Pêra as Sueli. The plot revolves around Pixote, a young boy who is used as a child criminal in muggings and drug transport.

Plot
After a police round up of street children, Pixote a 10-year-old boy is sent to a juvenile reformatory (FEBEM). The prison is a hellish school where Pixote uses glue sniffing as a means of emotional escape from the constant threats of abuse and rape.

It soon becomes clear that the young criminals are only pawns in the criminal, sadistic games of the prison guards and their commander.

When a boy dies of physical abuse by the guards, the officials frame (and ultimately kill) the lover of the trans woman known as Lilica for the murder.

Soon after, Pixote, his friend Chico, Lilica and her new lover Dito find an opportunity to flee from the prison. First, they stay at the apartment of Cristal, a former lover of Lilica, but when tensions arise they go to Rio for a cocaine drug deal; there, however, they get duped by showgirl Débora.

After some time bumming around the city, Pixote and his friends go to a club for another drug deal. While there, Pixote finds Débora and stabs her.

They become pimps for the prostitute Sueli who is definitely past her prime and is ill — possibly from a botched abortion. The group conspires to rob her johns, but when Lilica's lover Dito falls for Sueli, Lilica leaves. The robbery scheme fails when an American john fights back (because he apparently does not understand Portuguese) so they have to shoot him.  In the ensuing fight, Pixote accidentally shoots and kills Dito as well.

Pixote tries to gain comfort from Sueli, treating her as a mother figure by sucking on her breast, but she rejects him out of disgust. He leaves and walks down a railway line, gun in hand, disappearing in the distance.

Cast
 Fernando Ramos da Silva as Pixote
 Jorge Julião as Lilica
 Gilberto Moura as Dito
 Edilson Lino as Chico
 Zenildo Oliveira Santos as Fumaça
 Claudio Bernardo as Garatao
 Israel Feres David as Roberto Pie de Plata
 Jose Nilson Martin dos Santos as Diego
 Marília Pêra as Sueli
 Jardel Filho as Sapatos Brancos
 Rubens de Falco as Juiz
 Elke Maravilha as Debora
 Tony Tornado as Cristal
 Beatriz Segall as Widower
 João José Pompeo as Almir

Background

Casting

The movie is shot in the manner of a documentary and shows the strong influence by Italian neorealism in that amateur actors were used whose real lives strongly resembled those of the protagonists in the film.

Filming locations

It was filmed in São Paulo and Rio de Janeiro. The film features several scenes of Rio's beaches. Historical places in São Paulo like 'Viaduto do Chá' and the statue 'Monumento às Bandeiras' (at the Ibirapuera Park) are seen throughout the film.

Distribution

The film was first presented at the New York New Directors/New Films Festival on May 5, 1981. Later it opened on a limited basis in the United States on September 11, 1981.

The film was shown at various film festivals, including the San Sebastián International Film Festival, Spain; the Toronto Festival of Festivals, Canada; the Locarno International Film Festival, Switzerland; and others.

Critical reception
Film critic Roger Ebert, who wrote for the Chicago Sun-Times, considered the film a classic, and wrote, "Pixote stands alone in Babenco's work, a rough, unblinking look at lives no human being should be required to lead. And the eyes of Fernando Ramos da Silva, his doomed young actor, regard us from the screen not in hurt, not in accusation, not in regret - but simply in acceptance of a desolate daily reality."

Critic Pauline Kael was impressed by its raw, documentary-like quality, and a certain poetic realism.  She wrote, "Babenco's imagery is realistic, but his point of view is shockingly lyrical. South American writers, such as Gabriel Garcia Marquez, seem to be in perfect, poetic control of madness, and Babenco has some of this gift, too. South American artists have to have it, in order to express the texture of everyday insanity."

The New York Times film critic, Vincent Canby, liked the neo-realist acting and direction of the drama, and wrote, "[Pixote], the third feature film by the Argentine-born Brazilian director Hector Babenco, is a finely made, uncompromisingly grim movie about the street boys of São Paulo, in particular about Pixote - which, according to the program, translates roughly as Peewee...The performances are almost too good to be true, but Mr. Da Silva and Miss Pera are splendid. Pixote is not for the weak of stomach. A lot of the details are tough to take, but it is neither exploitative nor pretentious. Mr. Babenco shows us rock-bottom, and because he is an artist, he makes us believe it as well all of the possibilities that have been lost."

The review aggregator Rotten Tomatoes reports a positive score of 93% based on 14 reviews, with an average rating of 8.8/10. Although it was accepted as the Brazilian submission for the Academy Award for Best Foreign Language Film it was later disqualified since it was test marketed in Brazil before the allowable date.

Filmmakers Spike Lee, Mira Nair, Harmony Korine, Martin Scorsese, and the Safdie brothers have cited it as being among their favorite films.

Awards
Wins
 San Sebastián International Film Festival: OCIC Award - Honorable Mention; Hector Babenco; 1981.
 Locarno International Film Festival: Silver Leopard; Hector Babenco; 1981.
 Los Angeles Film Critics Association Awards: LAFCA Award; Best Foreign Film; 1981.
 New York Film Critics Circle Awards: NYFCC Award; Best Foreign Language Film; 1981.
 Boston Society of Film Critics Awards: BSFC Award; Best Actress, Marília Pêra; Best Film; 1982.
 National Society of Film Critics Awards, USA: NSFC Award Best Actress, Marília Pêra; 1982.

Nominations
 National Board of Review of Motion Pictures (US), Best Foreign Language Film; 1981.
 Golden Globes: Golden Globe, Best Foreign Film, Brazil; 1982.

See also
 Quem Matou Pixote? (Who Killed Pixote?)

References

External links
 
 Pixote at Film Reference
 Pixote film scene at YouTube
Pixote: Out in the Streets an essay by Stephanie Dennison at the Criterion Collection

1980 films
1980 crime drama films
1980 LGBT-related films
Brazilian crime drama films
Brazilian LGBT-related films
1980s Portuguese-language films
Brazilian independent films
Social realism in film
Films about prostitution in Brazil
1980s prison drama films
Films set in Rio de Janeiro (city)
Films shot in Rio de Janeiro (city)
Films set in São Paulo
Films directed by Héctor Babenco
Films about trans women